Regener is a German language habitational surname for someone from Regen. Notable people with the name include:
 Erich Regener (1881–1955), German physicist
 Michael Regener (born 1965), former singer of the neo-Nazi music group Landser
 Sven Regener (born 1961), German musician and writer

References 

German-language surnames
German toponymic surnames